Fábio da Silva Bordignon (born 20 June 1992) is a Brazilian Paralympic athlete competing in T35-classification events. In 2019, he qualified to represent Brazil at the 2020 Summer Paralympics in Tokyo, Japan.

Career 

He represented Brazil at the 2016 Summer Paralympics in Rio de Janeiro, Brazil and he won the silver medals in both the men's 100 metres T35 and men's 200 metres T35 events. In both events, the gold and bronze medals were won by Ihor Tsvietov and Hernan Barreto respectively.

At the 2017 World Para Athletics Championships in London, United Kingdom, he won the bronze medal in the men's 200 metres T35 event with a time of 26.94.

At the 2019 Parapan American Games held in Lima, Peru, he won the gold medal in the men's 100 metres T35 event and the bronze medal in the men's 200 metres T35 event. At the 2019 World Para Athletics Championships held in Dubai, United Arab Emirates, he finished in 4th place in both the men's 100 metres T35 and men's 200 metres T35 events.

Achievements

References

External links 

 

Living people
1992 births
Brazilian male sprinters
Medalists at the 2016 Summer Paralympics
Athletes (track and field) at the 2016 Summer Paralympics
Athletes (track and field) at the 2020 Summer Paralympics
Paralympic athletes of Brazil
Paralympic silver medalists for Brazil
Place of birth missing (living people)
Paralympic medalists in athletics (track and field)
Medalists at the 2019 Parapan American Games
21st-century Brazilian people